The Laforge-2 is a hydroelectric generating station on the Laforge River, a tributary of the La Grande River, and is part of Hydro-Québec's James Bay Project. The station can generate 319 MW and was commissioned in 1996. It is considered a "run of the river" generating station since the Laforge-2 Reservoir is located much farther upstream. Together with La Grande-1, they are the only two generating stations of the James Bay Project that use a reservoir without any major waterlevel fluctuations. Thus, the amount of electricity generated by the station depends almost entirely on the waterflow of the river, which is largely controlled by upstream reservoirs and generating stations.

See also 

 List of power stations in Canada
 Reservoirs and dams in Canada

External links 
 Hydro-Québec's La Grande Complex
 La Grande System
 Laforge-2

James Bay Project
Dams in Quebec
Dams completed in 1996
Dams on the Laforge River
Publicly owned dams in Canada